John Delamere is the name of:

John Delamere (footballer) (born 1956), Irish footballer
John Delamere (politician) (born 1951), New Zealand politician

See also
John Delamare ( – 1383), knight at the court of King Edward III of England